The Memorial Ground (also known as Finchampstead Park) is a cricket ground in Finchampstead, Berkshire, England. The ground is located at the northern end of the village and is part of a wider sporting complex.

History
Appearing on maps as early as 1930, Berkshire first played there against Buckinghamshire in the 1982 Minor Counties Championship. List A cricket was first played at the ground in the 1988 NatWest Trophy when Berkshire played Yorkshire, with their first-class opponents winning by 10 wickets. The ground was a venue for the 1993 Women's World Cup, hosting a single match between England Women and India Women, which England won by 3 runs. A second List A match was played there the following year in the 1994 NatWest Trophy with Kent as the visitors. With the exception of 1985, one Minor Counties Championship match was played there annually from Berkshire's first match there, with the ground also hosting its first MCCA Knockout Trophy match in 1997 when Berkshire played Shropshire. Two further List A matches were later played there, with Berkshire losing to Durham in the 2000 NatWest Trophy and defeating Ireland by 4 wickets. Six further MCCA Knockout Trophy matches have been played there, the last of which came in 2006 between Berkshire and Devon, while the arrangement of hosting one Minor Counties Championship match annually continues.

Finchampstead Cricket Club use the ground as their home venue. It also has football and hockey playing facilities, with Hellenic League members Finchampstead F.C. playing there.

Records

List A
 Highest team total: 384/6 (60 overs) by Kent v Berkshire, 1994
 Lowest team total: 97 all out (28.5 overs) by Berkshire v Durham, 2000
 Highest individual innings: 136* by Carl Hooper for Kent v Berkshire, 1994
 Best bowling in an innings: 5/87 by Philip Oxley for Berkshire v Kent, 1994

See also
List of cricket grounds in England and Wales

References

External links
Memorial Ground at ESPNcricinfo
Memorial Ground at CricketArchive

Berkshire County Cricket Club
Cricket grounds in Berkshire